Tricholomic acid is a non-proteinogenic amino acid found in some mushrooms, including Tricholoma muscarium.  It has a chemical structure similar to glutamic acid, hence the synonym cycloglutamate, and it interacts with glutamate receptors.  Because glutamate receptors are thought to be responsible for the reception of umami taste, tricholomic acid and close analogs have been investigated as flavor enhancers.

See also
 Ibotenic acid, a related compound found in mushrooms

References

External links
 Tricholomic acid, Human Metabolome Database

Non-proteinogenic amino acids
Isoxazolidinones